La Voix is the French Canadian version of the Dutch reality vocal competition created by John de Mol  The Voice of Holland. Season 6 of La Voix was broadcast in 2018 on TVA and was hosted for a sixth consecutive season by Charles Lafortune. Éric Lapointe was the only coach returning from the previous season, with Garou, Lara Fabian and Alex Nevsky replacing Marc Dupré, Pierre Lapointe and  Isabelle Boulay of the previous season.

Season

Blind Auditions

Les duel

Les chants de bataille (Knockouts)

Live Shows
From this stage on, all shows were broadcast live.

  Contestant saved
  Contestant eliminated

Episode 10 
At the beginning of the episode, Marc Dupré joined all 12 finalists in a collective song

Episode 11 
At the beginning of the episode, Serena Ryder sang collectively with the 12 finalists of the show.

Semi-final 

At the start of the show, Roch Voisine sang with the 8 semi-finalists.

Finals 
Yama Laurent from Team Garou won the title, obtaining 60% of popular vote. 

La Voix
2018 Canadian television seasons